Basanavičius is the masculine form of a Lithuanian family name. Its feminine forms  are: Basanavičienė (married woman or widow) and Basanavičiūtė (unmarried woman). The polish-language equivalent is Basanowicz.

The surname may refer to:

Jonas Basanavičius, Lithuanian political activist, proponent of Lithuania's National Revival movement
Vincas Basanavičius, Lithuanian folklorist

Lithuanian-language surnames